The 1979 Women's British Open Squash Championships was held at the Wembley Squash Centre in London from 23 February - 2 March 1979. The event was won by Barbara Wall who defeated Sue Cogswell in the final.

Seeds

First round

Draw and results

Third place play-off
 Angela Smith beat  Vicky Hoffman	9-1 9-7 9-10 9-1

References

Women's British Open Squash Championships
Women's British Open Squash Championship
Women's British Open Squash Championship
Squash competitions in London
Women's British Open Squash Championship
British Open
Women's British Open Squash Championship
Women's British Open Squash Championship